Gregg Braden (born June 28, 1954) is an American New Age author, who is known for his appearances in Ancient Aliens and his show Missing Links, and other publications linking science and spirituality. He became noted for his claim that the magnetic polarity of the Earth was about to reverse. Braden argued that the change in the earth's magnetic field might have effects on human DNA. He has also argued that human emotions affect DNA and that collective prayer may have healing physical effects. He has published many books through the Hay House publishing house. In 2009, his book Fractal Time was on the bestseller list of The New York Times.

Publications
 Awakening To Zero Point: The Collective Initiation (May 1, 1995)
 Walking Between the Worlds: The Science of Compassion (May 1, 1997)
 The Isaiah Effect: Decoding the Lost Science of Prayer and Prophecy (Jul 10, 2001)
 The Gregg Braden Audio Collection: Awakening the Power of Spiritual Technology (Mar 1, 2004)
 The Divine Name by Gregg Braden and Jonathan Goldman (November 1, 2004)
 The Divine Name: Sounds of the God Code by Gregg Braden and Jonathan Goldman - Audio CD with booklet (Nov 1, 2004)
 The God Code: The Secret of our Past, the Promise of our Future (Jan 1, 2005)
 Unleashing the Power of the God Code (May 1, 2005)
 Speaking the Lost Language of God (Aug 1, 2005)
 An Ancient Magical Prayer (Audio CD) (Sept 1, 2005)
 Secrets of the Lost Mode of Prayer: The Hidden Power of Beauty, Blessings, Wisdom, and Hurt (Jan 1, 2006)
 The Divine Matrix: Bridging Time, Space, Miracles, and Belief (Dec 1, 2006)
 The Spontaneous Healing of Belief: Shattering the Paradigm of False Limits (4-CD Set) (Apr 1, 2008)
 The Science of Miracles - The Quantum Language of Healing, Peace, Feeling, and Belief (March 1, 2009) 
 The Spontaneous Healing of Belief: Shattering the Paradigm of False Limits (Apr 1, 2009)
 The Mystery of 2012: Predictions, Prophecies, and Possibilities (Jan 1, 2009)
 Fractal Time: The Secret of 2012 and a New World Age  (Feb 1, 2010)
 Entanglement: A Tales of Everyday Magic Novel by Gregg Braden and Lynn Lauber (Jun 19, 2012)
 Deep Truth: Igniting the Memory of Our Origin, History, Destiny, and Fate (8-CD set) (Oct 15, 2012)
 The Turning Point: Creating Resilience in a Time of Extremes (Jan 28, 2014)
 Human by Design: From Evolution by Chance to Transformation by Choice (October 10, 2017)

Notes

References

External links
 
 
 

1954 births
Living people
New Age writers
2012 phenomenon believers